Dana Kuchtová (Born 18 June 1961, Český Krumlov, Czechoslovakia) is Czech politician, teacher and former environmental and anti-nuclear activist. 

Kuchova was a leader of the Czech Green Party and was Czech Minister of Education for 10 months in 2007 in the government of Mirek Topolánek.

External links  
 Dana Kuchtová personal page

Education ministers of the Czech Republic
Czech anti–nuclear power activists
People from Český Krumlov
1961 births
Living people
Green Party (Czech Republic) Government ministers
Women government ministers of the Czech Republic
University of South Bohemia alumni
21st-century Czech women politicians